JAMA Network Open is a monthly open access medical journal published by the American Medical Association  covering all aspects of the biomedical sciences. It was established in 2018 and the founding editor-in-chief is Fred Rivara (University of Washington). The journal is funded by article processing charges and most articles are available under a Creative Commons license. Article titles and abstracts are translated into Spanish and Chinese. According to Journal Citation Reports, the journal has a 2021 impact factor of 13.353, ranking it 15th out of 172 journals in the category "Medicine, General & Internal". Additionally, it ranks 5th among purely open access journals in that subject category.

Abstracting and indexing
The journal is abstracted and indexed in CINAHL, Emerging Sources Citation Index, and Index Medicus/MEDLINE/PubMed.

See also
 List of American Medical Association journals

References

External links

General medical journals
American Medical Association academic journals
Creative Commons Attribution-licensed journals
Monthly journals
Publications established in 2018
English-language journals